Shamil Khisamutdinov (born 1950) is a Russian wrestler. He won an Olympic gold medal in Greco-Roman wrestling in 1972, competing for the Soviet Union. He won gold medals at the 1973 and 1975 World Wrestling Championships. He was affiliated with Spartak Moscow.

References

External links
 

1950 births
Living people
Soviet male sport wrestlers
Olympic wrestlers of the Soviet Union
Wrestlers at the 1972 Summer Olympics
Russian male sport wrestlers
Olympic gold medalists for the Soviet Union
Olympic medalists in wrestling
Tatar people of Russia
Medalists at the 1972 Summer Olympics
Honoured Masters of Sport of the USSR
Spartak athletes
Tatar sportspeople